Marshall Township is one of sixteen townships in Clay County, Nebraska, United States. The population was fifty- four (54) at the 2020 census. A 2021 estimate placed the township's population at 54. Marshall Township, NE is a Very High Risk area for tornados. According to records, the largest tornado in the Marshall Township area was an F5 in 1964 that caused 50 injuries and 4 deaths. There have been 250 tornadoes since 1950, with an average of 3 tornadoes a year. The county has a significantly lower crime rate than the country as a whole and a mere 3.1% unemployment.

See also
County government in Nebraska

References
2. Tornado Information for Marshall Township, Nebraska, Homefacts.com - http://www.homefacts.com/tornadoes/Nebraska/Clay-County/Marshall-Township.html

External links
City-Data.com
http://www.homefacts.com/tornadoes/Nebraska/Clay-County/Marshall-Township.html

Townships in Clay County, Nebraska
Hastings Micropolitan Statistical Area
Townships in Nebraska